Planorbarius corneus, common name the great ramshorn, is a relatively large species of air-breathing freshwater snail, an aquatic pulmonate gastropod mollusk in the family Planorbidae, the ram's horn snails, or planorbids, which all have sinistral or left-coiling shells.

The shell of this species appears to be dextral in coiling, even though it is in fact sinistral or left-handed.

Distribution
Planorbarius corneus is distributed from western Europe, through central Europe and into the Caucasus, north into Siberia and south into the Middle East. In western Europe, it has been recorded in Belgium, France and the British Isles (including Britain, Ireland, the Isle of Man, Guernsey and Jersey). It is not found in Spain, but it has been recorded on some Spanish and Portuguese Atlantic islands, including Madeira, the Azores, the Canary Islands. In the Nordic countries, it has been recorded in Denmark, Finland, Sweden and Norway. Its range extends through central Europe (including Austria, Germany, the Netherlands, Luxembourg, Lichtenstein, Switzerland and the Czech Republic) into southern Europe (where it has been recorded in Greece and Italy) and eastern Europe and the Caucasus (including Albania, Armenia, Azerbaijan, Bosnia and Herzegovina, Bulgaria, Croatia, Estonia, Hungary, Latvia, Lithuania, Macedonia, Montenegro, Poland, Romania, Serbia, Slovakia, Slovenia and Ukraine). The species is also found in western Asia, having been recorded in Kazakhstan, Iran, western regions of Russia, Turkey, Turkmenistan and Uzbekistan.

Additionally, as the species is sometimes sold in the aquarium trade, it is also found outside of its main range in small ponds where they have been released or placed.

Description
All species within family Planorbidae have sinistral shells.

The  coiled shell has between 3 and 4.5 rounded whorls with deep sutures, the last whorl predominating. The upper side is weakly depressed and the lower side is deeply depressed (flattened on the underside but spire recessed on the upper side). There is no keel. The shell is light yellowish with a brown, reddish or greenish periostracum, radially and spirally weakly striated. The aperture is wide and almost circular. The animal is brown or reddish.

Habitat
This large planorbid is found in water which is still, or only moving slowly, where there is a good growth of many different kinds of pond weeds, and where there are high levels of calcium dissolved in the water.

P. corneus under high temperatures has been studied by Kartavykh & Podkovkin (2002).

Reproduction
Reproduction in spring and autumn at water temperatures above 15 °C, eggs (diameter 1.2-1.7 mm) are laid in mostly elongate capsules of 8–15 mm width, each strain containing 12-40 eggs, fixed to aquatic plants, embryos are reddish with transparent shells, juveniles hatch after 14–16 days, life span up to 3 years. Self-fertilization is possible, one single released animal can establish a stable population, but only 5% of the juveniles in self-fertilized eggs will hatch.

Parasites
This species of snail functions as a host for several parasite species:
 First intermediate host for Prosthogonimus ovatus
 First intermediate host for Apatemon gracilis
 First and as second intermediate host for Hypoderaeum conoideum
 Intermediate host for Syngamus trachea
 Intermediate host for Typhlocoelum sisowi

As aquarium pets 
P. corneus are available from commercial breeders, and they are easy to keep, as they do not need a minimum aquarium size, do not need heating, and likewise, the tank usually does not need to be oxygenated – though it helps to supply the microorganisms that process snail manure and food leftovers. They are said to only feed on living plants when other food sources (like algae and plant detritus) have become rare. They need calcium-rich water, so depending on the water source, they need additional calcium from cuttlebones or ground egg shells. The snails can be fed with any fish food, and vegetables like spinach leaves, green lettuce leaves and zucchini slices. In case of leafy or vegetable food, leftovers should be quickly removed in order to keep ammonium and nitrate levels low. Depending on the locale, a water conditioner is needed to remove copper, chlorine and other harmful ions from the water.

Both the European-Asian P. corneus and the smaller, North-American Planorbella duryi are known as "Ramshorn snails" in the aquarium trade and can be kept the same way, yet the adult Planorbella ones are significantly smaller, and their shells are smooth, shining and not striated.

References

 Spencer, H.G., Marshall, B.A. & Willan, R.C. (2009). Checklist of New Zealand living Mollusca. pp 196–219 in Gordon, D.P. (ed.) New Zealand inventory of biodiversity. Volume one. Kingdom Animalia: Radiata, Lophotrochozoa, Deuterostomia. Canterbury University Press, Christchurch.

External links

Planorbarius corneus at Animalbase taxonomy, short description, distribution, biology, status (threats) and images 
Planorbarius corneus images at Consortium for the Barcode of Life

Further reading
Minchin, D. 2021. Records of the cryptogenic Great Ramshorn Snail (Planorbarius corneus (Linnaeus)) from the Shannon Navigation. Irish Naturalists' Journal 37: Part 2 pp 81 - 84.

Planorbidae
Freshwater snails
Gastropods of Europe
Gastropods of Asia
Gastropods described in 1758
Taxa named by Carl Linnaeus